Ferrière-la-Grande is a commune in the Nord department in northern France. The river Solre flows through the commune.

In 1828 Pierre François Dumont applied for a concession to operate iron mines in the canton of Maubeuge, and for authorization to establish two iron furnaces at Ferrière-la-Grande powered by steam.
Dumont founded the factories at Ferrière-la-grande in 1830, the first coke-fired blast furnaces in the north of France to produce and mould pig-iron from the local minerals.
By decree of 23 April 1859 Dumont was granted a concession to build a railway line to link the factories Ferrière-la-Grande to the Saint-Quentin line at Erquelinnes.
The line was built on land acquired by Dumont or expropriated on the grounds of public utility.

Population

Heraldry

See also
Communes of the Nord department

References

Sources

Ferrierelagrande